Tech Mall is a shopping center located in Xitun District, Taichung, Taiwan. On 1 June 2020, the mall was forced to close by the Taichung City Government, which deemed the mall as an illegal construction.

See also
 List of tourist attractions in Taiwan

References

External links

2005 establishments in Taiwan
Shopping malls established in 2005
Shopping malls in Taichung
Buildings and structures in Taichung
Tourist attractions in Taichung
Defunct shopping malls in Taiwan
2020 disestablishments in Taiwan
Shopping malls disestablished in 2020